Busy Day is an American action film written by Robert Toth, and directed and produced by Tamas Nadas. The film stars , Tom Lister, Jr.,  Quinton Aaron, Keith Jardine, and Veronica Diaz-Carranza. Tamas Nadas is also the film's executive producer.

Plot 

Leo Morello (Attila), a mild-mannered musician and family man, has his life turned upside down when his former business associate Zeus (Eric Martinez) pulls him back into a life he tried so desperately to forget; an ultimatum leaves him facing former adversaries Johnny Burns (Lister) and the Tsar (Jardine).

Cast 
 Árpa Attila as Leo Morello
 Tom Lister, Jr. as Johnny Burns
 Quinton Aaron as Ivan
 Keith Jardine as The Tsar
 Veronica Diaz-Carranza as Perla
 Ron Weisberg as Levi
 Nathan Brimmer as Burns' Bodyguard

Production 
Filming commenced early June 2015 in Albuquerque, New Mexico. It is produced by Tamas Nadas, Zoltan Hodi, Rian Bishop, and Carlo Franco, along with co-producer Thadd Turner.

References

External links 
 

2017 films
2017 action films
Films shot in New Mexico
American action films
2010s English-language films
2010s American films